This is a list of the legislative assemblies of the Socialist Federal Republic of Yugoslavia.

Table of legislative assemblies by history and by jurisdiction

References

Socialist Federal Republic of Yugoslavia
Politics of Yugoslavia